Radič Petrović (1738–1816), known as Captain Radič (kapetan Radič), was a Serbian Revolutionary commander (vojvoda), earlier a Military Frontier guard and volunteer in the Austro-Turkish War (1787–91).

Early life and Habsburg service
Petrović was born in Siokovac in the Levač region, and moved to Ostružnica by the Sava. Many Serbs fled across the Danube and Sava into the Military Frontier of the Habsburg monarchy after increased Ottoman oppression.  Petrović and his family moved to Syrmia, and he entered Habsburg service, becoming a border guard. With the outbreak of the Austro-Turkish War (1787–91), he joined the Serbian Free Corps, a Serb volunteer unit fighting the Ottomans in central Serbia, consequently occupied by the Habsburgs (1788–92). For his operation, managing to open the Belgrade Fortress Gates, he was awarded the rank of captain. For his service during the war, he was awarded knighthood by Leopold II in 1792. He also served as a volunteer fighting the French. He used his military experience to train Serb rebels in the First Serbian Uprising (1804–13). The leader of the uprising, Karađorđe, who had fought in Petrović's volunteer unit, viewed him as his foster father.

Serbian Revolution
 
Petrović returned to Serbia (the Sanjak of Smederevo) in 1804 after the outbreak of the uprising. He distinguished himself throughout the uprising through military skills and prowess. After the liberation of Karanovac (now Kraljevo) in 1805, Karađorđe appointed him vojvoda (general). In March 1806, Ottoman commander Suleiman Pasha defeated the Serbian rebel band of Radič Petrović near the Studenica Monastery. He was seriously wounded during the Siege of Belgrade (1806), and became permanently hunched. After recovering, he stayed in Belgrade, and in 1808 became a magistrate. In the following years he took part in the fortification and defence of Ćuprija. After the Ottoman suppression of the uprising in 1813, he lived in Syrmia under very modest conditions. After the outbreak of the Second Serbian Uprising (1815), Radič Petrović returned to Serbia in 1816. His return was not seen positively by Miloš Obrenović, the new Serbian leader, due to Petrović's close ties to Karađorđe (now exiled) and the fear of mutiny against Obrenović. He was quickly captured and killed along with Petar Nikolajević Moler by the Ottomans, at close to 80 years of age.

Personal life
Petrović was regarded a great patriot and hero. He was physically strong and tall, described as very courageous, and was wounded several times in battles, allegedly having 30 wounds. He married three times, and from the first marriage he had two sons, and from the third, a daughter.

Legacy
In the Serbian historical drama TV series Vuk Karadžić (1987), Radič Petrović was played by Milan Srdoč.

See also
 List of Serbian Revolutionaries

References

Sources
  
  
  
  
 
 

18th-century Serbian people
19th-century Serbian people
Serbian military leaders
People of the Military Frontier
People of the First Serbian Uprising
People from Jagodina
Military personnel from Belgrade
Habsburg Serbs
Serbs from the Ottoman Empire
1738 births
1816 deaths